David D. Spencer (1799 Bristol, Ontario County, New York - February 18, 1855 Ithaca, Tompkins County, New York) was an American editor and politician from New York.

Life
In 1810, his family removed to Canandaigua, NY where he learned to be a printer. In 1820, he began publishing with Henry R. Stockton the Republican Chronicle in Ithaca, NY. In 1823, he married Melissa Lord, and they had five children. From 1828 to 1853, he published with Anson Spencer the Ithaca Chronicle.

He was a delegate to the 1839 Whig National Convention. He was one of the first three Inspectors of State Prisons elected on the Whig ticket in 1847 under the New York State Constitution of 1846, and drew the three-year term, being in office from 1848 to 1850.

His son Charles S. Spencer (b. 1824) was a member of the New York State Assembly in 1859 and 1874.

Sources
The New York Civil List compiled by Franklin Benjamin Hough (page 45; Weed, Parsons and Co., 1858)
Death of Hon. David D. Spencer in NYT on February 23, 1855
Newspaper history in Gazetteer and Business Directory for Tompkins County, NY (1868; page 30)

1799 births
1855 deaths
Politicians from Canandaigua, New York
Politicians from Ithaca, New York
New York State Prison Inspectors
19th-century American newspaper editors
New York (state) Whigs
19th-century American politicians
Journalists from New York (state)